Creekside Village could refer to:

 Whistler Blackcomb
 W.G. Brown Building/Astro Hill Complex

See also

 
 Creekside (disambiguation)
 Village (disambiguation)